Al Carter is a journalist.

Al Carter may also refer to:

Al "Earthquake" Carter, boxer
Al Carter (racing driver) in 2012 Pirelli World Challenge season

See also
Albert Carter (disambiguation)
Alan Carter (disambiguation)
Alfred Carter (disambiguation)
Alex Carter (disambiguation)